was a  after Ninpei and before Hōgen. This period spanned the years from October 1154 through April 1156.

Change of era
 February 14, 1154 : The new era name was created to mark an event or a number of events.  The previous era ended and a new one commenced in Ninpei 4, on the 28th day of the 10th month of 1154.

Events of the Kyūju era
 1154 (Kyūju 1, 5th month ): The udaijin Minamoto Masasada retired from public life to become a priest at age 61. He died several years later.
 1154 (Kyūju 1, 8th month): Fujiwara Saneyoshi, Grand General of the Right, was elevated to the role of Grand General of the Left; and the former dainagon Fujiwara Kanenaga (aged 17) was elevated to take on the newly vacated role of Grand General of the Right.
 August 22, 1155 (Kyūju 2, 23rd day of the 7th month): Emperor Konoe died at the age of 17 years without leaving any heirs.
 August 23, 1155 (Kyūju 2, 24th day of the 7th month): In the 14th year of Konoe-tennōs reign (近衛天皇14年), the emperor died; and despite an ensuring dispute over who should follow her as sovereign, contemporary scholars then construed that the succession (senso) was received by a younger brother, the 14th son of former-Emperor Toba. Shortly thereafter, Emperor Go-Shirakawa is said to have acceded to the throne (sokui).

Notes

References
 Brown, Delmer M. and Ichirō Ishida, eds. (1979).  Gukanshō: The Future and the Past. Berkeley: University of California Press. ;  OCLC 251325323
 Nussbaum, Louis-Frédéric and Käthe Roth. (2005).  Japan encyclopedia. Cambridge: Harvard University Press. ;  OCLC 58053128
 Titsingh, Isaac. (1834). Nihon Odai Ichiran; ou,  Annales des empereurs du Japon.  Paris: Royal Asiatic Society, Oriental Translation Fund of Great Britain and Ireland. OCLC 5850691
 Varley, H. Paul. (1980). A Chronicle of Gods and Sovereigns: Jinnō Shōtōki of Kitabatake Chikafusa. New York: Columbia University Press. ;  OCLC 6042764

External links
 National Diet Library, "The Japanese Calendar" -- historical overview plus illustrative images from library's collection

Japanese eras